Plebs is a British comedy series broadcast on ITV2. It was first broadcast in March 2013, and is produced by Tom Basden, Caroline Leddy, Sam Leifer and Teddy Leifer. It stars Tom Rosenthal, Ryan Sampson, Joel Fry (Series 1–3), and Jonathan Pointing (from Series 4), who play young residents of ancient Rome (plebs were ordinary non-patrician citizens of Rome). The format has been compared to The Inbetweeners, Up Pompeii and Chelmsford 123. The first series, comprising six episodes, was broadcast between 25 March and 22 April 2013. Three subsequent series of eight episodes each were broadcast between 22 September and 3 November 2014, between 4 April and 16 May 2016, and between 9 April and 21 May 2018. A fifth series was commissioned with Rosenthal, Sampson and Pointing all returning. The fifth series started on 30 September 2019, ending on 11 November 2019. On 30 April 2020 it was confirmed the series would end with a feature-length special. Due to the pandemic, filming was delayed but eventually completed in May 2022.

The show makes comical use of anachronistically modern parlance and concepts in a historical setting and uses predominantly ska/rocksteady music during all the opening and closing titles and during each episode as background music.

Premise
The show initially follows new arrivals from the provinces Marcus, Stylax, and their slave Grumio, as they deal with daily life in Ancient Rome. Marcus and Stylax work in the scriptorium of a grain company with their manager, Flavia, the water-carrier Aurelius, and communications officer Claudius. They live next door to two Britons: Cynthia, an aspiring actress, and her slave Metella, with their ever unscrupulous landlord a constant thorn in their sides.

Cynthia and Metella departed in Season 3, and introduces Delphine, a woman from Gaul, who begins a relationship with Marcus.

The fourth series replaces Stylax, who is crushed to death, with a new character, Jason, played by Jonathan Pointing and gives Aurelius a leading role. The four endeavour to run a bar in a renovated public toilet.

Cast

Only main and recurring characters are listed.

Production

Plebs is filmed at Nu Boyana Film Studios, Sofia, Bulgaria, as were 300:Rise of an Empire, The Expendables and The Hitman's Bodyguard.

For Soldiers of Rome, the film was also filmed in South Wales as well as its respected Bulgaria setting.

Episodes

Series overview

Series 1 (2013)

Series 2 (2014)
Series two began on ITV2 on Monday 22 September 2014 at 10 pm with a series-opener double bill. Rosenthal's father Jim Rosenthal appeared in the first episode as a commentator on a chariot race.

Series 3 (2016)
Series three began on ITV2 on Monday 4 April 2016 at 10 pm, with the broadcast of "The Beasts" and "Justin Junior".

Series 4 (2018)
Series four began filming in September 2017. The first two episodes aired on 9 April 2018 on ITV2.

Series 5 (2019)

Special

Home releases

International broadcast
Plebs premiered in Australia on 8 January 2015 on ABC2 and is available for streaming on ABC iview.
Plebs is available to stream in the USA on Freevee.

Awards

The show has been nominated for and won several awards throughout its run, with two notable wins being the Royal Television Society Award for Best Scripted Comedy in 2014, and the award for Best New Comedy Programme at the British Comedy Awards in 2013.

At the Royal Television Society Awards in 2014, nominations also went to Sam Leifer and Tom Basden for Best Comedy Writing, and Ryan Sampson for Best Comedy Performance. In 2013, Oli Julian was nominated for an RTS Craft and Design Award for Best Music and Original Title Music.

In 2014, Doon Mackichan was nominated for Best Female Performance in a Comedy Role at the British Academy Television Awards (BAFTAs), for her role as Flavia in Plebs. Sam Leifer and Teddy Leifer of Rise Films were also nominated for the Breakthrough Talent Award at the British Academy Television Craft Awards that year.

In 2016, the show received nominations for Best Comedy Series at the TV Choice Awards and for Best TV Situation Comedy at the Writers' Guild of Great Britain Awards. Series 4 of Plebs was nominated for Best Sitcom at the 2019 Rose d'Or Awards.

See also
 Chelmsford 123, an earlier British sitcom set in Britain during Roman times
 Kaamelott, a French series based on Arthurian legends

References

External links

2013 British television series debuts
2022 British television series endings
2010s British sitcoms
2020s British sitcoms
ITV sitcoms
English-language television shows
Fiction set in ancient Rome